Francesco Lodi (born 23 March 1984) is an Italian professional footballer who plays as a midfielder for Italian  club Catania. He usually plays as a deep lying playmaker, and is known for his passing qualities.

Club career

Empoli
Lodi started his career as part of Empoli youth system, being later promoted to the first team in 2003, despite his senior debut came during the 2000–01 season. During the winter transfer market, Empoli opted to loan the player out to Vicenza, in Serie B, for the player to gain regular playing time. He went on to make 11 appearances for the biancorossi before returning to Empoli for the 2004–05 season, following their relegation. In his first full season with the Tuscan side, Lodi made 27 league appearances, scoring six goals and helping them earn instant promotion back to Serie A. Lodi remained with Empoli, his first full season in Serie A. The midfielder made just 17 appearances, however, and failed to hold down first team football. He scored no goals.

Loan to Frosinone
For the 2006–07 season, Empoli loaned Lodi to Serie B side Frosinone for €50,000. Lodi instantly earned a starting role with the club, making 40 appearances out of a possible 42, scoring 11 goals. Despite his form, Empoli opted to keep the player at the Latium-based club in co-ownership deal for €1.4 million, where Lodi would continue his form. He went on to make 41 appearances for the second division side and scored a very impressive 20 goals as a midfielder. In January 2008, Empoli also bought back the 50% registration rights from Frosinone for €800,000.

Return to Empoli
Following Empoli's relegation from Serie A, the loan was not re-newed and the player spent the 2008–09 season with Empoli. He again performed with high standards, making 41 appearances and scoring 13 goals in league play. His form over the span of three seasons led to interest from a host of Serie A clubs, including Udinese, Atalanta and Chievo. At the start of the 2009–10 season, Lodi scored three goals in the first three games of Empoli's season, later joining Udinese on loan for the remainder of the 2009–10 season.

Udinese
On 28 August 2009, Lodi officially joined Udinese on loan from Empoli. During the season, Lodi found first team football hard to come by due to the presences of established midfielders Alexis Sánchez, Mauricio Isla, Gökhan Inler and Kwadwo Asamoah. Lodi went on to make 19 league appearances, scoring one goal. Udinese did not use the option to purchase the player outright, and he returned to Empoli on 30 June 2010.

Return to Frosinone
Following his Serie A top flight experience with Udinese, Lodi returned to Empoli but was instantly sold to Frosinone again on a co-ownership deal, for €300,000. In his return to Frosinone, Lodi returned immediately to first-team football, making 23 appearances (out of a possible 23) and scoring seven goals prior to the January transfer market, in which he again transferred clubs.

Catania
On 31 January 2011, Catania bought Lodi from Frosinone for €680,000, with Empoli retained 50% registration rights. Lodi also immediately joined Catania for the remainder of the 2010–11 season, in a two-and-a-half-year contract. His first two appearances for the Sicilian side were very low key, but on 13 February 2011, Lodi scored two fantastic free-kicks in a comeback 3–2 victory for Catania over Lecce. Lodi was also the scorer of a stunning free-kick against Juventus in the 96th minute of play, ending the game in a draw for Catania. In June 2011, Catania purchased Lodi outright for another €300,000. (the discount expressed as proventi da compartecipazioni  in Catania's account) He has since made 83 league appearances for the club, scoring 18 goals. He also scored three goals in four appearances in the 2012–13 Coppa Italia.

Genoa
On 3 July 2013, Catania sent Lodi to Genoa in exchange Panagiotis Tachtsidis in a cashless player swap. Both clubs retained 50% registration rights (co-ownership deal). The deal finalized in mid-July.

Catania (second time)
Lodi returned to Catania just six months after leaving the club, scoring a goal and providing an assist for Gonzalo Bergessio in his first match back, helping his club to defeat Bologna 2–0 at the Stadio Angelo Massimino.  In June 2014, the co-ownership deal also terminated.

Parma
Lodi was then loaned to Parma on 25 August 2014.

Return to Udinese
On 23 September 2015, Lodi rejoined former club Udinese as a free agent. He left the club on 17 February 2017.

Catania (third time)
After his contract at Udinese got terminated, the director of Catania confirmed on 2 March 2017, that Lodi was the first signing for the 2017–18 season.

Triestina
On 8 January 2020 he signed a 1.5-year contract with Serie C club Triestina.

FC Messina
On 22 January 2021, Lodi left Triestina to sign a one-and-a-half year contract with Serie D club FC Messina.

Acireale
In August 2021, Lodi signed for Serie D club Acireale.

Catania (fourth time)
In August 2022, Lodi agreed to return to refounded Serie D club Catania.

International career
Lodi was a player of the Italian under-19 team. He took part in 2001 UEFA European Under-16 Football Championship, the last named as under-16 event.

Due to UEFA U-21 Championship had changed from an even year event to odd year event, new coach Pierluigi Casiraghi called him up as senior member of the squad for 2007 UEFA European Under-21 Football Championship, eligible to players born 1984 or after. He made his Italy under-21 debut against Croatia in a friendly match on 15 August 2006 at the age of 22. Lodi did not receive a call-up for 2004–06 season of U21.

Honours
Italy U19
UEFA European Under-19 Football Championship: 2003

References

External links
Official Player Profile at calciocatania.it 
Profile at Football.it 

1984 births
Living people
Italian footballers
Serie A players
Serie B players
Serie C players
Association football forwards
Footballers from Naples
Empoli F.C. players
Frosinone Calcio players
L.R. Vicenza players
Udinese Calcio players
Catania S.S.D. players
Genoa C.F.C. players
Parma Calcio 1913 players
U.S. Triestina Calcio 1918 players
Italy under-21 international footballers
Italy youth international footballers